Senometopia is a genus of flies in the family Tachinidae.

Species
S. cariniforceps (Chao & Liang, 2002)
S. clara (Chao & Liang, 2002)
S. confundens (Rondani, 1859)
S. dentata (Chao & Liang, 2002)
S. distincta (Baranov, 1931)
S. excisa (Fallén, 1820)
S. excisa (Fallén, 1820)
S. fujianensis (Chao & Liang, 2002)
S. grossa (Baranov, 1934)
S. illota (Curran, 1927)
S. interfrontalia (Chao & Liang, 1986)
S. intermedia (Herting, 1960)
S. jilinensis (Chao & Liang, 2002)
S. kockiana (Townsend, 1927)
S. lena (Richter, 1980)
S. longiepandriuma (Chao & Liang, 2002)
S. mimoexcisa (Chao & Liang, 2002)
S. orientalis (Shima, 1968)
S. pilosa (Baranov, 1931)
S. pollinosa (Mesnil, 1941)
S. polyvalens (Villeneuve, 1929)
S. prima (Baranov, 1931)
S. quarta (Baranov, 1931)
S. quinta (Baranov, 1931)
S. ridibunda (Walker, 1859)
S. rondaniella (Baranov, 1934)
S. secunda (Baranov, 1931)
S. separata (Rondani, 1859)
S. shimai (Chao & Liang, 2002)
S. subferrifera (Walker, 1856)
S. susurrans (Rondani, 1859)
S. tertia (Baranov, 1931)
S. xishuangbannanica (Chao & Liang, 2002)

References

Diptera of Europe
Diptera of Asia
Diptera of Africa
Exoristinae
Tachinidae genera
Taxa named by Pierre-Justin-Marie Macquart